The grey-flanked cinclodes (Cinclodes oustaleti) is a species of bird in the family Furnariidae.It is found in Chile, adjacent western Argentina and Tierra del Fuego. Its natural habitats are subtropical or tropical dry shrubland and subtropical or tropical high-altitude shrubland.

References

grey-flanked cinclodes
Birds of Chile
Birds of Tierra del Fuego
grey-flanked cinclodes
Taxonomy articles created by Polbot